Marco Zamparella (born 1 October 1987 in San Miniato) is an Italian cyclist riding for .

Major results
2013
 3rd Coppa Agostoni
2016
 1st Stages 6 & 8 Vuelta al Táchira
2017
 1st Memorial Marco Pantani

References

1987 births
Living people
Italian male cyclists
People from San Miniato
Sportspeople from the Province of Pisa
Cyclists from Tuscany